Tim Wilson may refer to:
 Tim Wilson (broadcaster), New Zealand television news reporter and anchor
 Tim Wilson (canoeist), Australian canoeist
 Tim Wilson (comedian) (1961–2014), American comedian and country music artist
 Tim Wilson (filmmaker), American filmmaker known as Black Magic Tim
 Tim Wilson (American football) (1954–1996), American football running back
 Tim Wilson (Australian politician) (born 1980), Australian politician and commentator
 Tim Wilson (British politician) (born 1961), former British politician who appeared on The Circle

See also
 Timothy Wilson, American psychologist